Folkman Schaanning (August 17, 1886 – January 1, 1964) was a Norwegian actor. He appeared in several films.

Filmography

 1934: En stille flirt (Norwegian version) as Swanson, a photographer
 1938: Bør Børson Jr. as the office manager
 1940: Tante Pose as the provost
 1940: Tørres Snørtevold as Anton Jessen
 1941: Gullfjellet as the professor
 1942: Det æ'kke te å tru as the master barber
 1943: Den nye lægen as Pastor Reimers
 1943: Sangen til livet as Storm, a doctor
 1946: Et spøkelse forelsker seg as the admiral
 1948: Trollfossen as the impresario
 1948: Kampen om tungtvannet as the civil engineer
 1949: Vi flyr på Rio as Hazel, a professor
 1952: Nødlanding as the frightened painter
 1952: Andrine og Kjell as a bank manager
 1954: Portrettet as Johansen, an editor
 1954: Heksenetter as the theater director

References

External links
 
 Folkman Schaanning at Sceneweb
 Folkman Schaanning at the Swedish Film Database

1886 births
1964 deaths
20th-century Norwegian male actors
Actors from Trondheim